Øvre Eidfjord is a village in Eidfjord municipality in Vestland county, Norway. There are about 200 residents of Øvre Eidfjord.

The Norwegian National Road 7 runs through Øvre Eidfjord, through the Måbødalen valley, past the famous Vøringfossen waterfall, and then continues on, over the Hardangervidda plateau to Eastern Norway. The Hardangervidda Natursenter, the visitor centre for the nearby Hardangervidda National Park, is located here in Øvre Eidfjord.

There was a primary school in Øvre Eidfjord until 2005 when it was closed. Since then, local students have had to travel  to Eidfjord for their schooling.

References

Villages in Vestland
Eidfjord